Argos Limited, trading as Argos, is a catalogue retailer operating in the United Kingdom and Ireland, acquired by Sainsbury's supermarket chain in 2016. It was established in November 1972 and is named after the Greek city of Argos. The company trades both through physical shops and online, with 29 million yearly shop customers, and nearly a billion online visitors per annum. It has also franchised overseas to countries such as China.

History

The company was founded by Richard Tompkins who had previously established Green Shield Stamps in the United Kingdom. He came up with the idea that people could purchase goods from his "Green Shield Gift House" with cash rather than savings stamps. He rebranded the original Green Shield Stamps catalogue shops as Argos beginning in July 1973, the first purpose-built shop opening on the A28 Sturry Road, Canterbury in late 1973. Green Shield House was in Station Road, Edgware.

Argos was launched with thousands of staff, taking £1 million during a week in November. Argos was purchased by BAT Industries in 1979 for £32 million. In 1980, Argos opened its Elizabeth Duke jewellery counter (named after a director's wife) and by 1982, was the United Kingdom's fourth-biggest jewellery retailer. The Elizabeth Duke brand was later phased out, with products sold as "Jewellery and Watches".

The company was demerged from BAT Industries and listed on the London Stock Exchange in 1990. In April 1998, it was then acquired by GUS plc. In October 2006, it subsequently became part of Home Retail Group which was demerged from its parent company, GUS plc, with effect from 10 October 2006.

In January 2016, the sale of sister company Homebase for £340 million was announced.

In April 2016, Argos' parent Home Retail Group agreed to a £1.4 billion takeover by Sainsbury's, following a bidding war between the supermarket chain and South African conglomerate Steinhoff International. The acquisition was completed on 2 September 2016. A large number of high street and retail park shops were closed, replaced by an Argos outlet in a nearby Sainsbury's shop. When Sainsbury's announced in 2020 the closure of most Argos outlets, it was commented that the closure was an admission that its purchase of Argos had been a mistake; "Sainsbury's management clearly did not know how to run Argos and the plan to transplant into spare store space has not worked. ... Argos and Sainsbury's appealed to very different customer segments with little overlap."

In July 2020, Argos announced that it would be discontinuing production of its printed catalogue after 47 years.

On 5 November 2020, Sainsbury's announced that it would close 420 Argos standalone outlets by March 2024, leaving about 100; with other measures 3,500 Sainsbury's jobs were to be cut and £600m saved.

120 standalone Argos stores permanently closed and moved into the nearest Sainsbury's store. The measures were reported to be due to changing consumer habits and the growth of online shopping.

On 19 January 2023, it was announced that Argos would cease its operations in Ireland, including both its online business and its and physical shops, by 24 June 2023.

Current operations

 Argos is one of the UK's largest general merchandise retailers, operating both in stores and online.

Catalogue stores 
Argos is most well known for its traditional high street catalogue stores. The Argos shopping process traditionally involved completing a small order form with the catalogue numbers of the desired items. Argos provided red pencils (formerly small blue ballpoint pens, then blue pencils) in shops for this purpose. The order form was taken to the checkout and the items paid for, then the customer was given a receipt which indicates where they should wait for their items to be brought to them from the storeroom. Additionally, "Quick pay" kiosks were also available to place orders and pay. Upon handover of the goods (if shopping using the catalogue number method), after receiving the receipt from the checkout and the item had been collected by the customer, the receipt was stamped "RECEIVED" by the shop to ensure that it could not be reused.

In October 2012, Argos announced that, as of 2013, that they would be closing a number of their catalogue shops. Thus fewer catalogues would be made available nationwide. This decision was made after a significant profit fall, and also to boost the popularity of their online shop. Claims, however, from the media that the shops themselves would change from their states are false.

Since the acquisition of Argos by Sainsbury's, an increasing number of standalone stores have been moved into a nearby Sainsbury's store. On 25 September 2019, Sainsbury's announced that over 50 Argos stores would be closing or relocating in order to cut costs. Stores also began to feature digital computers as well as printed catalogues to cater to all client bases.

In July 2020, Argos announced that it would be discontinuing production of its printed catalogue after 47 years. In-store customers now order via in-store terminals that access the electronic catalogue.

Collection points 
Since the 2016 Sainsbury's takeover, Argos Collection points have been installed inside smaller Sainsbury's supermarkets unable to accommodate a full in-store concession, and inside some Sainsbury's Local convenience stores, with 317 locations as of May 2019.

Online
Despite Argos being known as a high street catalogue retailer, around 58% of sales are now derived online, with the Argos website being the third most visited retail website in the United Kingdom. Customers can shop and pay for their items online and get the item either delivered or "fast tracked".

Argos Financial Services
Argos Financial Services (formerly Argos Credit and Insurance) provides credit to enable the cost of purchases to be spread over a defined period of time. Since the Sainsbury's takeover of Argos, the Argos Financial Services division has been part of Sainsbury's Bank.

Argos credit card
In August 2006, Barclays and Argos announced a joint venture to produce an Argos credit card (in the same year Barclays also joined with Thomas Cook). Argos cancelled its contract with Barclaycard and a new Argos credit card was announced in 2012, this time in conjunction with Vanquis Bank.

Former operations

HomeStore&More
During 2007, Home Retail Group launched a trial of five shops, branded HomeStore&More, situated in Aylesbury, Abingdon, Cambridge, Harlow and Cheltenham. These stores were operated by Argos following Home Retail Group's acquisition of a stake in an Irish retail chain with the same name. The Harlow shop also included a "BedStore&More".
The trial was abandoned in February 2012, and the stores closed.

The Irish shops still operate, as well as at least one store in Scotland, with HRG's remaining interest sold in May 2013.

ArgosCompare
Argos operated a financial services price comparison website, in conjunction with BeatThatQuote.com. In January 2012, ArgosCompare was taken offline, as it did not comply with new guidance issued by the UK Financial Service Authority.

Argos TV
On 15 June 2011, Argos TV was launched on Sky channel 642 and online. On 25 October 2011, the channel was added to Freesat on channel 819.

On 19 September 2012, Argos TV launched on Freeview nationwide on channel 55 for a limited set of hours, as well as full-time in Manchester on channel 59.
As part of a reshuffle of the Freeview EPG, the Manchester version moved to channel 54 on 17 October 2012. Argos had leased the Sky EPG slot from JML Direct TV for 12 months to trial the channel and also used JML's facilities in Kentish Town.

The channel broadcast 24 hours daily, and was produced by ETV Media Group, with four hours of live programming each weekday, and eight hours a day at weekends. Viewers were able to purchase items and collect them from local Argos shops through the retailer's "check and reserve" service.

In 2013, the channel was removed from Freesat on 9 May, Freeview on 12 May and Sky on 13 May 2013 in order for Argos to focus resources in other areas. On Sky, it was immediately replaced with JML Living.

International shops
In February 2007, Argos opened five shops in Mumbai, India. Argos had a franchise agreement, run in conjunction with HyperCity; its Indian retail partner. In January 2009, Argos closed all its shops in India due to poor sales.

Product ranges

Own brands
Argos is the registered owner of a number of brands, which feature on a substantial number of products contained within the catalogue, including: Challenge, Visiq, Pro Action, Cookworks, Beanstalk, Pro Fitness, Opticom, Grosvenor, Steamworks, Aquarius, Coolworks, Elevation, Acoustic Solutions,  Mega Games and the now defunct Elizabeth Duke.

In January 2009, Argos also struck a deal to take over the brands Alba, Bush, and Chad Valley. In January 2015, Argos took over the rights to sell the Cherokee clothing line from Tesco, however this was phased out in 2017 in favour of Sainsbury's own Tu brand of clothing.

Marketing and branding

Logos

In October 2009, it was announced that the Argos visual branding would be undergoing changes from 2010. This began on 23 January, with the relaunch of the main shopping website, and a new logo. The websites claim to make shopping with Argos more accessible. The careers website, and the release of the Spring/Summer 2010 catalogue were also relaunched. The company expect that the rebranding process will take "a number of years", at a cost of £70 million.

Shop fascias

As part of the Autumn/Winter 2010 rebrand, all Argos Extra shops were planned to be branded simply as "Argos" when they are refitted. Former "Extra" marked lines will be available in all shops. However, stock levels will entirely depend on the area's demand for that particular line. If it does not sell, then the item will have to be ordered in to that shop.

As of 2018, a small number of older stores in operation remain unchanged with the original pre-2010 branding, store layouts and digital calculator-style 'stock checker' terminals (products' item numbers found in the catalogue could be entered to display in-store availability), while other stores have received a modern revamp with new branding, store layouts, colour scheme and touch-screens which can be used to browse all items, view details and photos, and check their stock availability.

Catalogue

The Argos Catalogue was published twice a year in paperback book form - a Spring/Summer edition in January and an Autumn/Winter edition in July. This event was known internally as a Cat Launch, and individual stores quite often held party-like festivities to drum up public excitement. Each catalogue had well over 1,600 pages containing brief descriptions of items, photographs, prices and an associated catalogue/item number. Shop-floor copies were ring-bound and the pages were individually laminated. Since the Autumn/Winter 2015 issue, the catalogues were reduced in shape by 1.5x compared to previous issues published over the years.

Catalogues were complemented throughout the year by occasional and seasonal sales flyers, offering price reductions on existing deals. Other products were sometimes available in flyers, such as ex-catalogue goods at reduced prices, especially after the launch of a new catalogue.

In March 2006, Argos carried out a trial of a new catalogue branded Argos Home in over 100 stores in the United Kingdom. This proved successful, and on 5 August 2006, it launched the second Argos Home catalogue, this time in all 200 Argos Extra stores. The catalogue only contained home furniture and styling tips for the current season. Most items displayed in the Argos Home catalogue were also available in the main catalogue. There were occasionally new lines in the Home catalogue which may not have been available at the time the main catalogue went to print. A Christmas mini-catalogue was also released each October.

It was announced on 29 July 2020 that Argos would no longer print paper catalogues and would instead list its products online only. Over the course of 93 editions, around 10 million copies were printed per edition at its peak. The digital catalogue can also be browsed using in-store screens.

Charity partnerships
As of July 2018, The official charity partner for Argos is The Alzheimer's Society. Previously they partnered with Macmillan Cancer Support which ran from 2015 until 2018.

Previous major charity partnerships including the Alzheimer's Society, which operates in England, Wales and Northern Ireland, and its sister charities Alzheimer Scotland and the Alzheimer Society of Ireland. All three charities will be Argos "Charity of the Year" in their respective territories in an arrangement scheduled to run until 2015. The Teenage Cancer Trust, which began in July 2010, and ran until July 2012, the British Heart Foundation (July 2008 to July 2010) and Help The Hospices (July 2006 to July 2008).

In a later charity initiative, Argos teamed up with Barnardo's in a six-week campaign in the run-up to Christmas 2012 that raised  £700,000 for the children's charity. Under the scheme customers brought in unwanted toys to Argos or Barnado's shops in return for £5 Argos vouchers. Argos passed on the old toys it collected to Barnado's for sale in the charity's own chain of shops.

Controversies

Sunday trading
In July 2002, Argos sparked a political controversy in Scotland, when it sacked several workers for refusing to work on a Sunday. This action would have been illegal in the rest of the United Kingdom, as the Sunday Trading Act 1994 gave shopworkers in England and Wales the right to refuse Sunday work (unless they were employed to work solely on a Sunday).

The 1994 Act did not apply to Scotland, as there was no legislation regarding Sunday trading applicable to Scotland. Although Argos later retracted its decision to sack the workers and to enforce a Sunday working clause in Scottish employee contracts, its actions led to the passing of the Sunday Working (Scotland) Act 2003 which extended the legal right of employees to refuse Sunday working to include shopworkers in Scotland.

Price fixing
In May 2002, Argos, along with rival retailer Littlewoods Index, was accused by the Office of Fair Trading of price fixing goods from toy manufacturer Hasbro. The decision reached in 2003 resulted in Argos being fined £17.28 million, however, an appeal in 2005 led to that being reduced to £15 million. Argos boss Terry Duddy gave evidence along with David Snow, Jonathan Ward, Alan Cowley, and Ian Thompson. Argos and the other companies appealed to the Court of Appeal, which dismissed the case and ruled in favour of the Office of Fair Trading in October 2006.

Furniture and skin burns
In February 2008, Chinese manufactured sofas from Argos and other retailers Land of Leather and Walmsleys were featured in a BBC Watchdog report on skin irritation. The Chinese manufacturer, LinkWise, denied that the furniture was to blame for the incidents. Watchdog praised Argos for its speedy voluntary recall of the affected products, compared to the two other retailers involved. However, during a lengthy case ending in 2010, customers won compensation against the company.

Pricing in Ireland
In January 2009, the higher price that Argos charged for goods in Ireland, compared to the United Kingdom, attracted criticism.

Workfare

In 2012, Argos withdrew from its involvement in the controversial Workfare scheme introduced by Prime Minister David Cameron. Argos and its parent company Home Retail Group were heavily criticised by some for their involvement in the scheme failing to offer jobs to those who successfully completed the course. An internal company poster produced by Home Retail Group's owned Homebase, supporting unpaid work to boost profits was leaked to the public, and led to the discontinuation of workfare by all companies within the Home Retail Group and several other major companies.

References

External links

 

1972 establishments in the United Kingdom
Companies based in Milton Keynes
Companies formerly listed on the London Stock Exchange
Retail companies established in 1972
Retail companies of the United Kingdom
British brands
British companies established in 1972
Sainsbury's
1998 mergers and acquisitions
2016 mergers and acquisitions